Flirting with Disaster is a 1996 American black comedy film written and directed by David O. Russell about a young father's search for his biological parents. It stars Ben Stiller, Patricia Arquette, Téa Leoni, Alan Alda, Mary Tyler Moore, George Segal, Lily Tomlin and Richard Jenkins. It was screened out of competition in the Special Screenings section at the 1996 Cannes Film Festival.

Plot
Mel Coplin and his wife, Nancy, live in New York, near Mel's neurotic, Jewish, adoptive parents, Ed and Pearl Coplin.  Mel and Nancy have just had their first child, and Mel won't decide on a name for their son until he can discover the identity of his biological parents.  When Tina, an adoption agency employee, locates his biological mother's name in a database, Mel decides to meet his mother personally.

The sexy but highly incompetent Tina decides to accompany Mel, Nancy, and the newborn on a trip to San Diego to meet Mel's biological mother.  The trip does not go as planned, and ends up becoming a tour of the United States.

In San Diego, Mel is introduced to Valerie, a blonde Scandinavian woman with Confederate roots whose twin daughters are a head taller than Mel. They realize that Valerie is not Mel's biological mother, and Tina scrambles to get the correct information from the agency database. Meanwhile, Nancy becomes jealous as Tina and Mel begin to flirt.

The group heads to Battle Creek, Michigan, with the hope of meeting the man whose name appears as the person who delivered infant Mel to the adoption agency. The man, Fritz Boudreau, turns out to be a trucker with a violent streak. However, when he discovers that Mel might be his son, he becomes instantly friendly and lets Mel drive his semi-trailer truck, which Mel immediately crashes into a Post Office building.

This leads to a run-in with two ATF agents, Tony and Paul, who are in a homosexual relationship. It is discovered that Tony and Nancy went to high school together. Charges are dismissed, and Fritz tells Mel that he is not Mel's father, but only handled Mel's adoption because Mel's biological parents were indisposed. Tina locates the current address of Mel's biological parents, in rural New Mexico. Tony and Paul surprise everyone by deciding to tag along.

While Mel and Tina become close, Nancy finds herself flirting with Tony, who returns the compliment, causing friction. The trip through rural New Mexico is fraught with more problems. The whole crowd finally descends on the front porch of Mel's true biological parents, Richard and Mary Schlichting. They are asked to stay the night.

While Richard and Mary are more than welcoming, Mel's biological brother Lonnie is overly rude and jealous. It is during dinner that Mel discovers that Richard and Mary had to let Mel be adopted because they were in jail for making and distributing LSD ( acid) in the late 1960s.  Not only that, but Richard and Mary continue to manufacture the drug, as becomes apparent when Lonnie, in an attempt to dose Mel with acid at dinner, accidentally doses Paul. Mel retires to Tina's bedroom, while Nancy and Tony share a room; neither couple is truly comfortable, leading to Nancy and Mel spending the night reconciling their issues. 

While the others are upstairs, the drugged Paul tries to arrest Richard and Mary, but Lonnie knocks him out with a frying pan. The three Schlichtings attempt to escape and decide to take Mel's car, hiding their supply of acid in the trunk. Ed and Pearl unexpectedly arrive, in their identical car, but then change their minds and decide to leave, taking the wrong car. When they change their minds again and make a blind U-turn on the nearly deserted highway, Mel's two sets of parents crash. Ed and Pearl are arrested while the Schlichtings escape to Mexico.

As morning arrives, not realizing what has happened, Mel and Nancy agree to name the baby Garcia, after Jerry Garcia. Called to the Sheriff's office to bail out Ed and Pearl, Mel refers to them as his parents, which they are surprised and happy to hear. Paul, Tony and Tina arrive, with Paul explaining the situation and getting Ed and Pearl released.

A montage of each family's personal relationshipsMel and Nancy, Paul and Tony and their Tina-arranged adopted baby, Ed and Pearl, the three Schlichtings, and a very pregnant Tinacontinues over the credits. Each family still have their troubles, but Mel and Nancy are happy together.

Cast

Production
Burt Reynolds was up for a role in the film, but Russell decided not to work with him after hearing he was abusive on the set of The Larry Sanders Show.

Reception
Rotten Tomatoes rated the film as "Certified Fresh" giving it an 88% based on 56 reviews. The site's consensus states: "Darkly funny, solidly cast, and surprisingly thoughtful, Flirting with Disaster proved David O. Russell's Spanking the Monkey was no fluke."

Soundtrack
A soundtrack album was released on Geffen Records that includes the following tracks

 "Anything But Love" (Dr. John and Angela McCluskey)
 "Somebody Else's Body" (Urge Overkill)
 "Outasight" (G. Love and The Philly Cartel)
 "You're Not a Slut" (Ben Stiller And Celia Weston)
 "Camel Walk" (Southern Culture on the Skids)
 Lend Me Your Comb" (Carl Perkins)
 "Acid Propaganda" (Lily Tomlin / Alan Alda / Ben Stiller)
 "You Part the Waters" (Cake)
 "Lonnie Cooks Quail" (Glen Fitzgerald)
 "Red Beans N' Reverb" (Southern Culture on the Skids)
 "Flirting with Disaster" (Dr. John and Angela McCluskey)
 "Hypospadia" (Patricia Arquette / Josh Boslin / Tea Leoni / Ben Stiller)
 "Melodie D'Amour (Cha, Cha, Cha D'Amour)" (Dean Martin)   
 "For Duty and Humanity" (Inch)
 "The Flirting Suit" (Stephen Endelman)

References

External links
 
 
 
 
 

1996 films
1990s English-language films
1990s black comedy films
1996 LGBT-related films
1990s comedy road movies
1990s screwball comedy films
1990s sex comedy films
Adultery in films
American black comedy films
American independent films
American LGBT-related films
American comedy road movies
American screwball comedy films
American sex comedy films
Bureau of Alcohol, Tobacco, Firearms and Explosives in fiction
Films about adoption
Films about dysfunctional families
Films about drugs
Films directed by David O. Russell
Films set in Michigan
Films set in New York City
Films set in New Mexico
Films set in San Diego
Films shot in New Jersey
Films shot in New York (state)
LGBT-related black comedy films
Miramax films
1996 comedy films
1996 independent films
1990s American films